Patryk Rombel (born 16 July 1983) is a Polish handball coach.

He coached the Polish team at the 2020 European Men's Handball Championship.

References

External links

1983 births
Living people
People from Kwidzyn
Polish handball coaches
Handball coaches of international teams
Polish expatriate sportspeople in Ukraine